Evangelos Voultsos (born 10 August 1948) is a Greek water polo player. He competed in the men's tournament at the 1972 Summer Olympics.

References

External links
 

1948 births
Living people
Greek male water polo players
Olympic water polo players of Greece
Water polo players at the 1972 Summer Olympics
Place of birth missing (living people)